This is a list of Test cricketers who were born in a country that does not currently play Test cricket.

Updated 29 May 2017. Players in bold are still active.

References

External links
Cricinfo
 Nationalities of Test Cricketers

Lists of Test cricketers